Below is an alphabetical list of notable Hungarian writers.
Abbreviations: children's (ch), comedy (co), drama (d), fiction (f), non-fiction (nf), poetry (p)

A–B

C–F

G-J

K

L–O

P–S

T-Z

References

 
Hungarian
Writers